Mohamed Ahmed (born 14 July 1999), known as Beso, is an Egyptian professional footballer who plays as a midfielder for Al Ahly.

Club career
Beso began his career with Ittihad El Shorta, before being scouted by Egyptian giants Al Ahly in 2010. Although negotiations initially stopped, Al Ahly came back with another offer, and Beso made the switch to the Cairo-based club.

After ten years in Cairo, Beso was loaned out to Czech National Football League side Viktoria Žižkov in 2021, alongside teammates Mido Hossam and Mostafa Fawzy. However, after only two appearances, Beso was recalled, and instead loaned to Slovakian side Zemplín Michalovce. In completing this move, he became the first Egyptian to play for the club.

Career statistics

Club

Notes

References

1999 births
Living people
Egyptian footballers
Association football midfielders
Al Ahly SC players
FK Viktoria Žižkov players
MFK Zemplín Michalovce players
Czech National Football League players
Egyptian expatriate footballers
Egyptian expatriate sportspeople in the Czech Republic
Expatriate footballers in the Czech Republic
Expatriate footballers in Slovakia